Anton Wackerle (born 13 February 1938) is a German bobsledder. He competed in the four-man event at the 1964 Winter Olympics.

References

1938 births
Living people
German male bobsledders
Olympic bobsledders of the United Team of Germany
Bobsledders at the 1964 Winter Olympics
Sportspeople from Garmisch-Partenkirchen